Hrdinové mlčí   is a 1946 Czechoslovak drama film, directed by Miroslav Cikán. It stars  Ladislav Boháč, Zdeněk Dítě, and František Filipovský.

References

External links
Hrdinové mlčí  at the Internet Movie Database

1946 films
Czechoslovak drama films
1946 drama films
Films directed by Miroslav Cikán
Czech war drama films
Czech resistance to Nazi occupation in film
Czechoslovak black-and-white films
1940s war drama films
Czech World War II films
Czechoslovak World War II films
1940s Czech films